P. James Debney (born c. 1968) is the former CEO and president of American Outdoor Brands Corporation, the parent company of firearms manufacturer Smith & Wesson.

Debney was CEO of American Outdoor Brands (previously known as Smith & Wesson Holding Corporation) starting in 2011. In January 2020, Debney was replaced, with the board of directors stating that he had "engaged in conduct inconsistent with a nonfinancial company policy." In late February 2020, a separation agreement showed that Debney would receive a compensation package from American Outdoor Brands worth over $1 million. His total compensation for the fiscal year ending in April 2019 had been $3.8 million.

References

External links

 Profile at bloomberg.com
 Smith & Wesson Inside The Chamber James Debney Shot Show 2014 via YouTube

Living people
1960s births
Year of birth missing (living people)
American chief executives
American people of British descent
Alumni of the University of Manchester